Verónica Falcón (born August 8, 1966), credited as Veronica Falcon and occasionally Veronica Falcón, is a Mexican actress and choreographer. When it comes to her English-speaking roles, she is best known for playing Camila Vargas in three seasons of Queen of the South and Lupe Gibbs in the 2020 HBO reboot of Perry Mason. In 2022, Falcón played Camila Elizondo (sister of cartel boss Omar Navarro), for Season 4 of Ozark.

Biography 
Falcón was born August 8, 1966, in Mexico City, Mexico. Ignoring stigma perpetuated by her family, Falcón went into the entertainment industry, finding success over three decades working as an actress and choreographer in Mexico's National Opera Company, on Mexican television. In Mexican film, she captured mainstream attention for her performance as La Madrina Everardo Gout's 2011 film Days of Grace, in 2014, Falcón was nominated by PECIME — the Asociación de Periodistas Cinematográficos de México — for the Diosas de Plata award for best supporting film actress for her role as La Diabla in the 2013 film Besos de Azúcar.

In 2016, at the age of 50, she made the decision to risk forgoing an established career in Mexico to further her career in the U.S., strongly believing such opportunities should be taken. She is purported to be the first Mexico-born actress to secure a second lead role in a U.S. TV drama, thanks to her role as Camila Vargas in 39 episodes of Queen of the South. In 2019, Falcón was awarded the Outstanding Performance in a Television Series Impact Award for her portrayal of Camila Vargas in Queen of the South at the 22nd annual National Hispanic Media Coalition Impact Awards Gala.

In 2019, Falcón took the recurring role of Clara in eight episodes of the Steven Conrad neo-noir thriller television series Perpetual Grace, LTD alongside Sir Ben Kingsley and Luis Guzmán. In 2020, she starred as Marianne Sancar in the film Voyagers alongside Colin Farrell and Lily-Rose Depp. She also began starring in the HBO reboot of Perry Mason, where she's the love interest of private investigator Perry Mason, played by Matthew Rhys. Falcón also appeared in the 2021 Disney film Jungle Cruise with Dwayne Johnson and Emily Blunt.

In 2021, Falcón joined the cast of Ozark as Camila Elizondo, sister of cartel boss Omar Navarro (played by Felix Solis) for 9 episodes of Season 4 alongside Jason Bateman and Laura Linney.

Filmography

Film

Television

Awards and nominations

References

External links
 
 
Veronica Falcon Interview on American Latino YouTube channel

1966 births
21st-century Mexican actresses
Actresses from Mexico City
Living people
Mexican television actresses
Mexican telenovela actresses
Mexican film actresses
Mexican stage actresses